Diego del Río (born 4 September 1972) is a former professional tennis player from Argentina.

Career
del Rio was a doubles specialist and appeared in the main draw of seven Grand Slam tournaments. He only once progressed past the first round, which was in the 1999 French Open with Martín Rodríguez, where they made the round of 16. The Argentine also competed in the mixed doubles in that event (partnering Laura Montalvo), as well as at that year's Wimbledon (with María Fernanda Landa), but fell at the first round in each. He was involved in a long deciding set in the 1999 Australian Open, which he and partner Mariano Puerta lost 13–15, to Brent Haygarth and T.J. Middleton.

In 1998 he and Puerta won the Colombia Open. It would be the only final that del Rio reached during his career on the ATP Tour. He had also been a semi-finalist in Colombia two years earlier and made the semi-finals at the 1999 Merano Open.

ATP career finals

Doubles: 1 (1–0)

Challenger titles

Doubles: (12)

References

External links
 
 

1972 births
Living people
Argentine male tennis players
Tennis players from Buenos Aires
20th-century Argentine people
21st-century Argentine people